Skarnes is the administrative centre of Sør-Odal Municipality in Innlandet county, Norway. The village lies along the river Glomma, about half-way between the villages of Disenå and Sander. The new Sør-Odal municipal hall is located in the village. Construction was finished in 2010.

The Kongsvingerbanen railway line runs through the village, stopping at Skarnes Station which opened in 1862. The European route E16 highway runs through the village.

Location 
The village consists of three parts. The "original" Skarnes is on the south side of the river Glomma, near a bridge. The area called Tronbøl is south of the original village area, on the same side of the river. The third part of the village is Korsmo, across the river to the northwest.

Notable people
Charles Berstad (born 1964), football player
Magnus Gullerud (born 1991), handball player
Kent Håvard Eriksen (born 1991), football player
Kåre Tveter (1922–2012), painter
Øystein Sunde (born 1947), musician
Hanne Tveter (born 1974), jazz vocalist
Elias Akselsen (born 1947), singer
Veronica Akselsen (born 1986), singer

References

Sør-Odal
Villages in Innlandet
Populated places on the Glomma River